The 2007–08 Minnesota Wild season began October 4, 2007. It was the Wild's eighth season in the National Hockey League (NHL). They won their first Northwest Division title this season.

Key dates prior to the start of the season:

The 2007 NHL Entry Draft took place in Columbus, Ohio, on June 22–23
The free agency period began on July 1.

Regular season

Divisional standings

Conference standings

Schedule and results

|- style="background-color:#CCFFCC"
| 1 || October 4 || Chicago || 0 – 1 || Minnesota ||  || Backstrom || 18,568 || 1–0–0 || 2
|- style="background-color:#CCFFCC"
| 2 || October 6 || Columbus || 2 – 3 || Minnesota ||  || Backstrom || 18,568 || 2–0–0 || 4
|- style="background-color:#CCFFCC"
| 3 || October 10 || Edmonton || 0 – 2 || Minnesota ||  || Backstrom || 18,568 || 3–0–0 || 6
|- style="background-color:#CCFFCC"
| 4 || October 13 || Minnesota || 3 – 2 || Phoenix ||  || Backstrom || 12,088 || 4–0–0 || 8
|- style="background-color:#CCFFCC"
| 5 || October 14 || Minnesota || 2 – 0 || Anaheim || || Harding || 17,174 || 5–0–0 || 10
|- style="background-color:#ffffff"
| 6 || October 16 || Minnesota || 3 – 4 || Los Angeles || SO || Backstrom || 14,239 || 5–0–1 || 11
|- style="background-color:#CCFFCC"
| 7 || October 20 || Minnesota || 3 – 1  || St. Louis || || Harding || 19,150 || 6–0–1 || 13
|- style="background-color:#CCFFCC"
| 8 || October 21 || Colorado || 2 – 3 || Minnesota || || Backstrom || 18,568 || 7–0–1 || 15
|- style="background-color:#ffbbbb"
| 9 || October 24 || Minnesota || 3 – 5 || Calgary || || Backstrom || 19,289 || 7–1–1 || 15
|- style="background-color:#ffffff"
| 10 || October 25 || Minnesota || 4 – 5 || Edmonton || SO || Harding || 16,839 || 7–1–2 || 16
|- style="background-color:#ffbbbb"
| 11 || October 28 || Minnesota || 1 – 3 || Colorado || || Harding || 17,041 || 7–2–2 || 16
|- style="background-color:#ffbbbb"
| 12 || October 30 || Pittsburgh || 4 – 2 || Minnesota || || Harding || 18,568 || 7–3–2 || 16

|- style="background-color:#ffbbbb"
| 13 || November 1 || St. Louis || 3 – 2 || Minnesota ||  || Harding || 18,568 || 7–4–2 || 16
|- style="background-color:#CCFFCC"
| 14 || November 3 || Calgary || 1 – 4 || Minnesota ||  || Backstrom || 18,568 || 8–4–2 || 18
|- style="background-color:#CCFFCC"
| 15 || November 5 || Edmonton || 2 – 5 || Minnesota ||  || Backstrom || 18,568 || 9–4–2 || 20
|- style="background-color:#ffbbbb"
| 16 || November 11 || Minnesota || 2 – 4 || Colorado ||  || Backstrom ||  15,434 || 9–5–2 || 20
|- style="background-color:#ffbbbb"
| 17 || November 13 || Minnesota || 2 – 3 || Calgary ||  || Backstrom || 19,289 || 9–6–2 || 20
|- style="background-color:#CCFFCC"
| 18 || November 15 || Minnesota || 4 – 2 || Edmonton ||  || Backstrom || 16,839 || 10–6–2 || 22
|- style="background-color:#ffbbbb"
| 19 || November 16 || Minnesota || 2 – 6 || Vancouver ||  || Harding ||  18,630 || 10–7–2 || 22
|- style="background-color:#CCFFCC"
| 20 || November 18 || Colorado || 1 – 4 || Minnesota ||  || Harding || 18,568 || 11–7–2 || 24
|- style="background-color:#ffbbbb"
| 21 || November 21 || Vancouver || 4 – 2 || Minnesota ||  || Harding || 18,568 || 11–8–2 || 24
|- style="background-color:#ffbbbb"
| 22 || November 23 || Columbus || 4 – 0 || Minnesota ||  || Backstrom || 18,568 || 11–9–2 || 24
|- style="background-color:#ccffcc"
| 23 || November 24 || Minnesota || 4 – 3 || Nashville ||  || Backstrom || 12,639 || 12–9–2 || 26
|- style="background-color:#ccffcc"
| 24 || November 28 || Phoenix || 1 – 3  || Minnesota ||  || Backstrom || 18,568 || 13–9–2 || 28
|- style="background-color:#ccffcc"
| 25 || November 30 || St. Louis || 2 – 3 || Minnesota || OT || Backstrom || 18,568 || 14–9–2 || 30

|- style="background-color:#ccffcc"
| 26 || December 2 || Vancouver || 1 – 2 || Minnesota ||  || Backstrom || 18,568 || 15–9–2 || 32
|- style="background-color:#ffbbbb"
| 27 || December 5 || Philadelphia || 3 – 1 || Minnesota ||  || Backstrom || 18,568 || 15–10–2 || 32
|- style="background-color:#ffbbbb"
| 28 || December 7 || Minnesota || 0 – 5 || Detroit ||  || Harding || 19,508 || 15–11–2 || 32
|- style="background-color:#ccffcc"
| 29 || December 8 || Minnesota || 2 – 1 || Columbus || || Backstrom || 15,666 || 16–11–2 || 34
|- style="background-color:#ffbbbb"
| 30 || December 11 || Minnesota || 1 – 4 || San Jose ||  || Backstrom || 17,064 || 16–12–2 || 34
|- style="background-color:#ccffcc"
| 31 || December 14 || Minnesota || 5 – 2 || Anaheim ||  || Harding || 17,174 || 17–12–2 || 36
|- style="background-color:#ccffcc"
| 32 || December 15 || Minnesota || 2 – 1 || Los Angeles ||  || Harding || 16,648 || 18–12–2 || 38
|- style="background-color:#ccffcc"
| 33 || December 18 || Nashville || 2 – 3 || Minnesota ||  || Harding || 18,568 || 19–12–2 || 40
|- style="background-color:#ccffcc"
| 34 || December 20 || N.Y. Rangers || 3 – 6 || Minnesota ||  || Harding || 18,568 || 20–12–2 || 42
|- style="background-color:#ffbbbb"
| 35 || December 22 || Detroit || 4 – 1 || Minnesota ||  || Backstrom || 18,568 || 20–13–2 || 42
|- style="background-color:#ffbbbb"
| 36 || December 26 || Minnesota || 3 – 8 || Dallas ||  || Harding || 18,532 || 20–14–2 || 42
|- style="background-color:#ccffcc"
| 37 || December 27 || Minnesota || 3 – 2 || Phoenix ||  || Backstrom || 13,756 || 21–14–2 || 44
|- style="background-color:#ccffcc"
| 38 || December 29 || Edmonton || 4 – 5 || Minnesota || OT || Backstrom || 18,568 || 22–14–2 || 46
|- style="background-color:#ffbbbb"
| 39 || December 31 || San Jose || 3 – 2 || Minnesota ||  || Backstrom || 18,568 || 22–15–2 || 46

|- style="background-color:#ccffcc"
| 40 || January 3 || Dallas || 3 – 6 || Minnesota ||  || Backstrom || 18,568 || 23–15–2 || 48
|- style="background-color:#ffbbbb"
| 41 || January 5 || Minnesota || 1 – 4 || Nashville ||  || Harding || 17,113 || 23–16–2 || 48
|- style="background-color:#ffbbbb"
| 42 || January 7 || Minnesota || 1 – 3 || Dallas ||  || Backstrom || 17,502 || 23–17–2 || 48
|- style="background-color:#ccffcc"
| 43 || January 10 || Minnesota || 6 – 5 || Detroit || SO || Harding || 17,848 || 24–17–2 || 50
|- style="background-color:#ccffcc"
| 44 || January 11 || Minnesota || 5 – 2 || Chicago ||  || Harding || 21,139 || 25–17–2 || 52
|- style="background-color:#ccffcc"
| 45 || January 13 || Phoenix || 1 – 4 || Minnesota ||  || Harding  || 18,568 || 26–17–2 || 54
|- style="background-color:#ffffff"
| 46 || January 16 || Calgary || 3 – 2 || Minnesota || SO || Backstrom || 18,568 || 26–17–3 || 55
|- style="background-color:#ffbbbb"
| 47 || January 18 || Anaheim || 4 – 2 || Minnesota ||  || Harding || 18,568 || 26–18–3 || 55
|- style="background-color:#CCFFCC"
| 48 || January 21 || Minnesota || 4 – 2 || Vancouver ||  || Backstrom || 18,630 || 27–18–3 || 57
|- style="background-color:#ffbbbb"
| 49 || January 22 || Minnesota || 1 – 2 || Calgary ||  || Harding || 19,289 || 27–19–3 || 57
|- style="background-color:#CCFFCC"
| 50 || January 24 || Minnesota || 3 – 2  || Colorado ||  || Backstrom  || 15,321  || 28–19–3  || 59
|- style="background-color:#CCFFCC"
| 51 || January 30 || Anaheim || 1 – 5  || Minnesota ||  || Backstrom  || 18,568  || 29–19–3  || 61

|- style="background-color:#CCFFCC"
| 52 || February 2 || Minnesota || 4 – 1 || Columbus ||  || Backstrom || 18,529 || 30–19–3  || 63
|- style="background-color:#ffffff"
| 53 || February 5 || Detroit || 3 – 2 || Minnesota || OT || Backstrom  || 18,568  || 30–19–4 || 64
|- style="background-color:#ffbbbb"
| 54 || February 7 || Dallas || 1 – 0 || Minnesota ||  || Backstrom  || 18,568 || 30–20–4  || 64
|- style="background-color:#CCFFCC"
| 55 || February 9 || NY Islanders || 3 – 4 || Minnesota || OT || Backstrom || 18,568  || 31–20–4 || 66
|- style="background-color:#CCFFCC"
| 56 || February 10 || Minnesota || 2 – 1 || St. Louis || SO || Harding || 16,477 || 32–20–4 || 68
|- style="background-color:#ffbbbb"
| 57 || February 12 || Minnesota || 2 – 4 || Edmonton ||  || Harding || 16,839 || 32–21–4 || 68
|- style="background-color:#CCFFCC"
| 58 || February 14 || Minnesota || 5 – 4 || Vancouver || SO || Backstrom || 18,630 || 33–21–4 || 70
|- style="background-color:#CCFFCC"
| 59 || February 17 || Nashville || 4 – 5 || Minnesota || OT || Backstrom || 18,568 || 34–21–4 || 72
|- style="background-color:#ffffff"
| 60 || February 19 || Vancouver || 3 – 2 || Minnesota || OT || Backstrom || 18,568 || 34–21–5 || 73
|- style="background-color:#ffbbbb"
| 61 || February 20 || Minnesota || 0 – 3 || Chicago ||  || Harding || 17,812 || 34–22–5 || 73
|- style="background-color:#ffbbbb"
| 62 || February 24 || Calgary || 2 – 1 || Minnesota ||  || Backstrom || 18,568 || 34–23–5 || 73
|- style="background-color:#ffbbbb"
| 63 || February 26 || Minnesota || 1 – 4 || Washington ||  || Backstrom || 17,391 || 34–24–5 || 73
|- style="background-color:#ccffcc"
| 64 || February 27 || Minnesota || 3 – 2 || Tampa Bay ||  || Backstrom || 17,211 || 35–24–5 || 75
|- style="background-color:#CCFFCC"
| 65 || February 29 || Minnesota || 3 – 2 || Florida ||  || Backstrom || 16,927 || 36–24–5 || 77

|- style="background-color:#CCFFCC"
| 66 || March 2 || Los Angeles || 1 – 2 || Minnesota || OT || Backstrom || 18,568 || 37–24–5 || 79
|- style="background-color:#ffbbbb"
| 67 || March 4 || Chicago || 4 – 2 || Minnesota ||  || Backstrom || 18,568 || 37–25–5 || 79
|- style="background-color:#ffbbbb"
| 68 || March 6 || Minnesota || 2 – 3 || Carolina ||  || Harding || 16,297 || 37–26–5 || 79
|- style="background-color:#ffffff"
| 69 || March 7 || Minnesota || 2 – 3 || Atlanta || SO || Backstrom || 18,709 || 37–26–6 || 80
|- style="background-color:#ffffff"
| 70 || March 9 || San Jose || 3 – 2 || Minnesota || SO || Backstrom || 18,568 || 37–26–7 || 81
|- style="background-color:#ffffff"
| 71 || March 13 || New Jersey || 4 – 3 || Minnesota || SO || Backstrom || 18,568 || 37–26–8 || 82
|- style="background-color:#CCFFCC"
| 72 || March 15 || Los Angeles || 0 – 2 || Minnesota ||  || Backstrom || 18,568 || 38–26–8 || 84
|- style="background-color:#CCFFCC"
| 73 || March 17 || Colorado || 1 – 3 || Minnesota ||  || Backstrom || 18,568 || 39–26–8 || 86
|- style="background-color:#ffffff"
| 74 || March 19 || Minnesota || 3 – 4 || San Jose || SO || Backstrom || 17,496 || 39–26–9 || 87
|- style="background-color:#CCFFCC"
| 75 || March 21 || Minnesota || 2 – 1 || Vancouver ||  || Backstrom || 18,630 || 40–26–9 || 89
|- style="background-color:#ffbbbb"
| 76 || March 22 || Minnesota || 4 – 5 || Calgary ||  || Harding || 19,289 || 40–27–9 || 89
|- style="background-color:#ffbbbb"
| 77 || March 24 || Minnesota || 3 – 5 || Edmonton ||  || Harding || 16,839 || 40–28–9 || 89
|- style="background-color:#CCFFCC"
| 78 || March 26 || Edmonton || 1 – 3 || Minnesota ||  || Backstrom || 18,568 || 41–28–9 || 91
|- style="background-color:#CCFFCC"
| 79 || March 28 || Vancouver || 0 – 4 || Minnesota ||  || Backstrom || 18,568 || 42–28–9 || 93
|- style="background-color:#CCFFCC"
| 80 || March 30 || Colorado || 2 – 3 || Minnesota || OT || Backstrom || 18,568 || 43–28–9 || 95

|- style="background-color:#CCFFCC"
| 81 || April 3 || Calgary || 1 – 3 || Minnesota ||  || Backstrom || 18,568 || 44–28–9 || 97
|- style="background-color:#ffffff"
| 82 || April 6 || Minnesota || 3 – 4 || Colorado || SO || Harding || 18.007 || 44–28–10 || 98

Playoffs
The Wild clinched a playoff spot for the 2008 Stanley Cup playoffs, but lost in the Quarter-finals to the Colorado Avalanche, four games to two.

Player statistics

Skaters
Note: GP = Games played; G = Goals; A = Assists; Pts = Points; PIM = Penalty Minutes

Goaltenders
Note: GP = Games played; TOI = Time on ice (minutes); W = Wins; L = Losses; OT = Overtime/shootout losses; GA = Goals against; SO = Shutouts; SV% = Save percentage; GAA = Goals against average

Awards and records

Records

Milestones

Transactions
The Wild have been involved in the following transactions during the 2007–08 season.

Trades

Free agents acquired

Free agents lost

Draft picks
Minnesota's picks at the 2007 NHL Entry Draft in Columbus, Ohio.

Farm teams

See also
2007–08 NHL season

References

Player stats: Minnesota Wild player stats on espn.com
Game log: Minnesota Wild game log on espn.com
Team standings: NHL standings on espn.com

Minn
Minnesota Wild
Minnesota Wild seasons